City of Parks is a municipal project to create a continuous paved pedestrian and biking trail around the city of Louisville, Kentucky while also adding a large amount of park land. The project was announced on February 22, 2005. There are also plans to connect the  Louisville trail to a planned seven mile (11 km) trail connecting the Southern Indiana cities of New Albany, Clarksville and Jeffersonville.

Louisville Loop
The Louisville Loop is a planned  bike and pedestrian trail which will circle the city of Louisville, Kentucky when completed, using the trail to connect many of the city's existing parks and future parks.

History

The city's first bike path effort, Beargrass Bikeway, which connects Cherokee Park to the Belvedere, was opened in 1980 but received little use. The section connecting the Belvedere to Shawnee Park was first proposed in 1988.

Existing sections
The Louisville Loop currently extends a total of 30 miles from the Farnsley-Moremen House to Downtown.

The first completed section of the Louisville Loop was created in the 1980s and is known as the Riverwalk. It is a  bike and jogging trail running along the city's Ohio River waterfront from the Belvedere to Chickasaw Park. It passes through Lannan Park in Portland and Shawnee Park along the way. The trail passes through the former Portland Wharf area, which was razed for I-64 development, and the old street grid is still visible. Along the way, there are mileage markers on the surface of the trail every tenth of a mile, as well as markers giving information on 19th century river culture, such as units of measurement, river jobs, and types of riverboats.

The second oldest section of the Louisville Loop is the  Levee Trail, which spanning the flood protection from runs from Riverside Park in Pleasure Ridge Park to the Farnsley-Moremen House to Lees Lane.

In 2007, the  Mill Creek Trail was completed, connecting the Levee Trail and The Riverwalk, ending at Lee Lane in Riverside Gardens.  A small stretch of the Mill Creek Trail had been completed in 2002 by LG&E, on whose property much of the trail is located, which ran from Greenwood Rd. to Mill Creek. An extension added by the city in 2007 included a $2 million bridge over Mill Creek.

Future sections
The total trail length for a completed Louisville Loop is estimated at 110 mile one way. The next sections of the Louisville Loop are slated for completion by 2013 and they will connect the Jefferson Memorial Forest, McNeely Park, Floyds Fork watershed, EP Sawyer State Park, and River Road corridor using the proposed trails:
Jefferson Memorial Forest Trail
Floyds Fork Trail
Eastern Suburbs Trail
River Road/Waterfront Trail

Gallery

See also
List of attractions and events in the Louisville metropolitan area
List of parks in the Louisville metropolitan area
Louisville Waterfront Park
Emerald Necklace, a series of connected parks around Boston

References

External links
 Louisville Loop official site
 21st Century Parks—Website
 The Parklands of Floyds Fork—Website
 Mayor Greg Fischer announced increasing the Tree Canopy over the city by more than 1,500 trees over 10 years—Louisville.gov October 24, 2013
 Bridges Progressing At The Parklands of Floyds Fork – BrokenSidewalk  January 2012
 City of Parks page at LouisvilleKY.gov (includes a map)
 Louisville Olmsted Parks Conservancy
 Construction begins on Parklands of Floyds Fork – August 2010
 Floyds Fork Parks Get $10 Million Boost -- August 2010
 New park system named Parklands of Floyds Fork -- August 2010
  New Property Connects Sections of Jefferson Memorial Forest -- November 2009 (includes a map)

Parks in Louisville, Kentucky
Tourist attractions in Louisville, Kentucky
Projects established in 2005
2005 establishments in Kentucky
Proposed parks in the United States